The 2009 Dutch TT was the seventh round of the 2009 Grand Prix motorcycle racing season. It took place on the weekend of 25–27 June 2009 at the TT Circuit Assen.

Valentino Rossi won the MotoGP race, his 100th career victory, ahead of teammate Jorge Lorenzo, with Australia's Casey Stoner, who led early on, finishing third.

MotoGP classification

250 cc classification

125 cc classification

Notes

Championship standings after the race (MotoGP)
Below are the standings for the top five riders and constructors after round seven has concluded.

Riders' Championship standings

Constructors' Championship standings

 Note: Only the top five positions are included for both sets of standings.

References

Dutch TT
Dutch
Tourist Trophy